Francis: Pray for me is a 2015 Argentine film, starring Darío Grandinetti as Pope Francis. The film is based on the 2013 book, Pope Francis: Life and Revolution, which was written by Francis' close friend Elisabetta Piqué who is also a correspondent for the Argentine newspaper, La Nación in Italy and the Vatican since 1999. The film was released as Papa Francisco: The Pope Francis Story in the Philippines.

Plot 
The story narrates the life of Jorge Mario Bergoglio (Darío Grandinetti), the man who would later become Pope Francis in the perspective of a Spanish journalist named Ana (Silvia Abascal), who first met the future pope at the 2005 Papal conclave, until the naming of Bergoglio as pope at the 2013 Papal conclave.

Cast
 Darío Grandinetti as Jorge Bergoglio
 Silvia Abascal as Ana
 Leticia Brédice as Cecilia
 Laura Novoa as Regina Bergoglio
 Leonor Manso as Rosa Margherita Vasallo Bergoglio
 Jorge Marrale as José Bergoglio
 Gabriel Gallichio as Jorge Bergoglio (young)
 Alejandro Awada as Luis
 Carola Reyna as Agustina
 Marta Beláustegui as Carmen

Production 
The script is based on the 2013 book Pope Francis: Life and Revolution, written by journalist Elisabetta Piqué. Productor Pablo Bossi met Piqué in November 2013, and announced his intention to shoot the film. She met the script writer Beda Docampo Feijóo in January 2014, and he soon wrote the first script for the film. The actor Darío Grandinetti visited the Vatican and had a brief interview with Francis, studying him to make an accurate play. Shooting for the film began in January 2015 in Buenos Aires, Argentina.

Release 
The film was first released in Argentina on 10 September 2015 and was later released in Spain on 18 September 2015. In the Philippines, the film was released on theaters nationwide under the title Papa Francisco: The Pope Francis Story on 30 September 2015 with Pioneer Films as distributor.

Reception 
Horacio Bilbao, from the Clarín newspaper considered it a below-average film. The biography of Francis is treated like a hagiography, and the controversial aspects of his life are treated in a simplistic way. For instance, it is unclear if the character played by Alejandro Awada is supposed to be based on Horacio Verbitsky, who would be the woman asking him to ignore the political corruption scandals, and the truthfulness in the depiction of the meeting of Bergoglio and Massera.

See also
Chiamatemi Francesco, 2015 Italian film about Pope Francis

References

External links 
 

2015 films
Films about popes
Argentine biographical films
Works about Pope Francis
Films shot in Buenos Aires
Films set in Buenos Aires
Films about journalists
Films set in Rome
2010s Argentine films